Tom Lillycrop (born 29 November 1991) is a professional rugby league footballer who play as  for the Batley Bulldogs in the Betfred Championship.

Club career

Rugby League
Lillycrop has previously played for the Dewsbury Rams and Sheffield Eagles in the Championship.

Rugby Union
On 24 October 2019 it was reported that Lillcrop had switched codes to join Cleckheaton RUFC.

References

External links
Sheffield Eagles profile

1991 births
Living people
Batley Bulldogs players
Dewsbury Rams players
English rugby league players
Rugby league props
Sheffield Eagles players